Kerstin Mey (born 1963) is a German academic and president of the University of Limerick.  She was the first woman to head a university in Ireland, on an acting basis, and having participated in an international competition, was appointed to the full position with effect from 8 October 2021.  She held positions in a number of universities in Germany and the United Kingdom before moving to Limerick in the west of Ireland.

Biography

Early life and education
Kerstin Mey was born in East Berlin, Germany in 1963. She attended Humboldt University, where she studied Art and German (language and literature). She ultimately earned a PhD in Art Theory and Aesthetics.

Academic and administrative career
She was pro-vice-chancellor and dean of the Westminster School of Media, Arts and Design, and professor of Contemporary Art and Theory at the University of Westminster. In April 2018, she became the vice-president for Academic Affairs and Student Engagement for the University of Limerick as well as the institution's Professor of Visual Culture.

Other roles
Mey has held a number of positions in education including Director of GuildHE Research, a higher education training cooperative in the United Kingdom, and serving on the Austrian Science Board. Mey is currently on the ISEA International Advisory Committee. She also serves as a member of the board of directors of the Irish Chamber Orchestra.

Presidency
In July 2020 she was appointed interim president of the University of Limerick.  The university ran a global search and competition for the presidency over the following months, and Mey was announced as the winning candidate. She was empowered as the president of the university at the meeting of its governing authority on 8 October 2021.

References and sources

1963 births
Presidents of the University of Limerick
People from East Berlin
Living people
Humboldt University of Berlin alumni